Yingzhou or Ying Prefecture was a prefecture (zhou) in imperial China centering on modern Yingde, Guangdong, China. It existed intermittently from 947 until 1195.

References
 

Prefectures of Southern Han
Guangnan East Circuit
Former prefectures in Guangdong